The 20th International 500-Mile Sweepstakes Race was held at the Indianapolis Motor Speedway on Monday, May 30, 1932. Attrition was the story of the race, with 26 of the 40 cars dropping out due to crashes or mechanical failure. A record eight different drivers led laps during the race, with no driver seemingly able to hold the lead without experiencing some sort of trouble. For the third year in a row, Billy Arnold looked as if he would be the dominant car, but he sailed over the turn three wall on lap 59. Rookie Bob Carey also hit the wall while leading. Fred Frame took the lead for good on lap 152, and won from the 27th starting position - the furthest back of any winner except for Ray Harroun in 1911 and later, Louis Meyer in 1936. Frame was accompanied by riding mechanic Jerry Houck.

In the third year of the "stock-based" formula (also known as the "Junk" formula), speeds were beginning to increase once again, but not quite to levels seen in the late-1920s. Lou Moore qualified for the pole position with an average speed of 117.363 mph, the fastest time trial run in three years. Likewise on race day, Frame's winning average speed of 104.144 mph broke Peter DePaolo's record set back in 1925.

The race was part of the 1932 AAA Championship Car season. The month was marred by two fatalities during practice. Riding mechanic Harry Cox was killed in a crash on May 25, and driver M. C. Jones died from injuries suffered in a crash on May 27.

Race schedule

Practice – April
The deadline for entries to be received was midnight on Monday May 2. Teams and drivers began arriving at the Speedway in early April, setting up shop in Gasoline Alley. In addition, Tom Beall's popular diner was already open in the garage area. Tony Gulotta was on the track in the Hunt Special on April 6, as was Lou Moore in the Boyle Valve Special. Making news in mid-April was Argentine driver Juan Gaudino, who arrived on April 13 to enter the race for the first time. Gaudino had intended to enter in 1931, but withdrew after a crash in South America just before he was to make the trip.

On Monday April 18, Joe Russo was practicing on the track when he lost control at the north end and crashed into the retaining wall. He suffered minor injuries to his head and face, and needed three stitches to his lip. The frame of the car was bent, but the car was expected to be repaired.

Billy Devore, Terry Curley, S.T. "Pink" Donaldson, and Bert Lustig, all arrived from the west coast on April 21, each looking for rides. Some of the biggest news came on April 27. Babe Stapp was seriously injured in a crash at Legion Ascot Speedway, and would be forced to sit out the month of May.

By the end of April, at least nine cars were already at the Speedway being prepped. Drivers were even spending some free time at the Speedway Golf Course.

Practice – Week 1
The deadline for entries to be received was midnight on Monday May 2. Though initially down from the previous year (72 entries), at least 40 cars had submitted entries by May 1, and more were expected when postmarked entries were all processed.

Sunday May 1: Tony Gulotta and Luther Johnson teamed up to test one of the Studebaker entries for 660 miles at an average speed of 102.6 mph.
Monday May 2: More entries continued to come in, swelling the entry list to 68 cars. Of interest was the Bowes Seal Fast team announcing a three-car effort with drivers Bill Cummings, Louis Schneider, and Deacon Litz
Tuesday May 3: Last-minute entries brought the total to 71-72 cars, matching the number from 1931.
Wednesday May 4: Juan Gaudino was sent to the hospital with burns on his face and hands after an acetylene torch he was working with exploded in the garage area. He was expected to be back in the car within a couple days. Russ Snowberger was out on the track, and suffered a flat tire.
Friday May 6: Though track activity had been fairly light most of the week, by Friday, over one-third of the 71 expected entries had arrived at the Speedway.
Saturday May 7: Some of the drivers left Indianapolis for the day to compete in other events. Billy Arnold, Deacon Litz, and Ira Hall competed in a special race meet in Chicago. Bill Cummings, Billy Winn, Paul Bost, and others raced at Langhorne.

Practice – Week 2
Monday May 9: The five Studebaker Specials entries were out on the track on Monday. The drivers were Tony Gulotta, Luther Johnson, Peter Kreis, Cliff Bergere, and Bob McDonogh. Off the track, 1930 winner Billy Arnold was married in Chicago. He was expected to arrive at the track for practice later in the week.
Tuesday May 10: Much of Tuesday was spent taking photographs with the cars and drivers.
Wednesday May 11: At approximately 3 p.m., Ira Hall went into turn one at about 106 mph when he lost control. The car started sliding to the inside fence, he corrected, and the car slid up to the outside barrier. It slid along the outside wall for about 100 feet, then spun to the middle of the track. The car's frame was broken in the front. Neither Hall nor his riding mechanic G.A. Casey were injured. Leon Duray arrived at the Speedway for the first time Wednesday evening.
Thursday May 12: Russ Snowberger was out on the track Thursday in the Hupp Comet. He had two laps of 114 mph. L. L. Corum, whose car was now disassembled, was not expected to be out on the track again for another week. Harry Miller's 16-cylinder machine (driven in 1931 by Shorty Cantlon) was expected to arrive on Friday and be on the track with Bryan Saulpaugh behind the wheel.
Friday May 13: T.E. "Pop" Meyers announced that he declined Louis Schneider's request to use car #13, citing a AAA Contest Board rule. Few cars made laps Friday, owing not little to the superstitious nature of Friday the 13th. Chet Miller took a few laps, but lightly brushed the wall in the south short chute. Peter Kreis did a ten-lap radiator test in his Studebaker, then was reportedly upset when informed he was driving on Friday the 13th. Also on the track were Frank Brisko and Roy Painter, but only for one or two slow laps apiece.

Practice – Week 3
Sunday May 15: Joe Huff was out on the track in the S.O. Goldberg entry. Billy Arnold arrived at the Speedway Sunday, and expected to drive his first laps on Tuesday. Fred Frame was in Reading for the weekend, and won two races. Leon Duray's 16-cylinder car was seen in the garage area, and was expected to practice on Tuesday. After overheating problems plagued the car in 1931, the team reported that significant improvements had been made for 1932.
Monday May 16: Wilbur Shaw was reported to be en route to the Speedway from California.
Tuesday May 17: Louis Schneider was out on the track in the #1 Bowes Seal Fast Special. Juan Gaudino, who lost time due to changing engines, was now reportedly out on the track regularly. Off the track, Gar Wood was named the official starter for race day.
Wednesday May 18: Several cars took to the track on Wednesday, as elimination trials were drawing closer. Frank Brisko made several medium paced laps, Louis Meyer was on the track in his 16-cylinder machine, and Joe Huff had been on the track as well (105 mph). Al Miller ran a lap of 111 mph, and Bryan Saulpaugh drove one of Harry Miller's 16-cylinder machines. Just before sunset, Roy Painter suffered a flat tire going into turn three. He avoided another car, and swerved into the outside wall. The car suffered a bent rear spring and axle. Painter and his riding mechanic Thane Houser were not injured, and the car was expected to be repaired by the end of the week.
Thursday May 19: Lou Moore led the speed chart with a practice lap of 117 mph. Also out on the track were Louis Meyer (112 mph), Luther Johnson, Fred Frame, Marion Trexler, Billy Winn, Bob Carey, and Gene Haustein. Just before sundown, Russ Snowberger suffered a flat tire as he was driving through turn 3. He skidded but kept the car off the wall.
Friday May 20: Newcomer Mauri Rose, driving the Jones-Miller, skidded at the exit of turn 4, and hit the outside wall. The car slid along the outside hub rail, crossed the track, then came to rest along the inside barrier. Rose was not injured, but the car suffered damage to the frame. Ira Hall, who hit the wall earlier in the month, was back out on the track Friday. Howdy Wilcox II completed a lap of 113.5 mph.

Time trials
Qualifications was scheduled for seven days, starting on Saturday May 21, and continuing through Friday May 27. Four-lap (10 mile) qualifying runs were used. Each entry was allowed three attempts to qualify. The minimum speed for qualifying was set at 100 mph. Each day of time trials would end at sundown.

Saturday May 21
The first day of time trials was scheduled for Saturday May 21 from 10:00 a.m. to 6:59 p.m. (sundown). All cars were required to be in line no later than 5 p.m. in order to make a qualifying attempt. Over 12,000 spectators arrived under hot and sunny weather conditions. During a run in the morning, Bryan Saulpaugh driving one of Harry Miller's 16-cylinder machines, had just completed a lap of 116 mph when a tire blew going into turn 1. Traveling more than 120 mph, he entered the turn too fast and the tread sheared off the tire. The car broke into a spin, but Saulpaugh was able to keep the car off the wall. Also having trouble in the morning was Zeke Meyer, who hit the wall in turn four after something broke in the steering mechanism.

Frank Brisko (111.149 mph) was the first driver to complete a qualifying run. Luther Johnson blew a tire and pulled into the pits during his first attempt. The early qualifiers were led by Billy Arnold, who put in a four-lap average of 116.290 mph. Bryan Saulpaugh, who had avoided serious mishap during a practice run, rebounded to post a four-lap average of 114.369 mph, good enough for the front row.

Late in the day, Lou Moore took the track, and grabbed the pole position with a four-lap average of 117.363 mph. His fourth lap (118.577 mph) was a single-lap track record for a non-supercharged engine. Last year's polesitter Russ Snowberger qualified fourth.

The day ended with the field filled to 21 cars.

Source: The Indianapolis News

Sunday May 22
The second day of time trials was held Sunday May 22. Only two cars qualified, Wilbur Shaw and Al Aspen. Shaw's four-lap average speed (114.326 mph) time was identical to Russ Snowberger's from a day earlier.

Source: The Indianapolis News

Monday May 23
The third day of time trials was held Monday May 23. Hartwell "Stubby" Stubblefield wowed the crowd with a first lap of 117.310 mph, nearly as fast as the pole position. He upped his speed to 117.540 mph, and appeared to be on his way to becoming the fastest qualifier. On his fourth and final lap, however, he sensed he had a tire going down. Going into turn 3, he backed off and attempted to coast around to the pits, intending to abort the run. He shut the engine off on the mainstretch, but inadvertently coasted across the finish line. Officials ruled that he had completed the run, and the time would stand. His fourth lap of 101.488 pulled his four-lap average down to 112.988 mph. Instead of being the fastest qualifier, he had to settle for the slower speed, but nevertheless, was safely qualified.

Bob McDonogh made a conservative run of 113.279 mph, to be the fastest car of the afternoon, and the first four-wheel drive car in Indy history. Phil Shafer was the only other qualifier, putting in a speed of 110.708 mph without wearing a helmet.

By the end of the third day, only 26 (of 40) grid position had been filled. With many strong contenders still in the garage area, officials reiterated that qualifications would continue through Saturday as needed, to ensure all cars had the opportunity to qualify.

Source: The Indianapolis News

Tuesday May 24
The fourth day of time trials was held Tuesday May 24. Qualifications continued to move at a slow pace, as only two cars completed runs Tuesday. Late in the day, Gus Schrader was the first driver out, in the four-wheel drive Miller Special. The car had only been on the track three days, and the 112.003 mph average, though safe to make the field, was said to be modest to its capabilities. Fred Frame was the only other driver on the track, also driving a newly arrived machine. Frame's car had arrived only three days earlier, and had been on the track only once, but not at speed.

Source: The Indianapolis News

Wednesday May 25
The fifth day of time trials was held Wednesday May 25. To the increasing chagrin of officials, only one car completed a qualifying attempt, further dragging out the already slow qualifying process. Chet Miller secured the 29th spot in the field, leaving eleven spots open. The day was marred by the death of Harry Cox, the riding mechanic for Bennie Benefiel. The car hit the inside wall, lost a wheel, then skidded into the outside wall. The car went over the outside retaining wall in turn 1, and dropped twenty feet to the ground. It hit two trees, then came to rest against another tree. Benefiel and Cox were thrown from the car. Benefiel was conscious but seriously injured. Cox suffered a broken neck and other injuries, and died at the scene.

Louis Schneider had his car out on the track for practice, but came in complaining of steering problems. Roy Painter announced his car was withdrawn due to an illegal tread width.

Source: The Indianapolis News

Thursday May 26
The sixth day of time trials was held Thursday May 26. For the second day in a row, only one car completed a run. Louis Schneider, driving the same Bowes Seal Fast entry he won with in 1931, took the 30th starting position.

Source: The Indianapolis News

Friday May 27
The seventh day of time trials was held on Friday May 27. The day was marred by the second fatality in three days. M. C. Jones and his riding mechanic Harold Gray were on a practice run early in the day when car went out of control in turn one. The car went over the wall in turn one, and landed upright on a grassy plot outside of the track. Both Jones and Gray were thrown from the car. Gray survived, suffering a broken arm and internal injuries. Jones died about six hours later at City Hospital. In a separate incident, Ira Hall crashed his already-qualified car in turn 3. The car was badly damaged, but Hall was not injured. Also having trouble was Paul Rice, whose car broke a front axle. He narrowly missed hitting the outside wall at the exit of turn four.

Seven cars completed qualifying runs, but George Howie would eventually be "crowded out" (bumped) from the field on Saturday. Gene Haustein made an unsuccessful attempt.

Source: The Indianapolis News

Saturday May 28
The final day of time trials was held on Saturday May 28. Due to the number of spots remaining, and the number of entries still to qualify, the hours for qualifying were extended to 10:00 a.m. to 4:00 p.m. for Saturday. The field was filled to 40 cars, and two drivers (George Howie and James Patterson) were "crowded out." Kelly Petillo made the field just before the close of qualifying.

After qualifying concluded, the track was closed to clean up oil spills and prepare the surface for the race. A brief session was allowed late Sunday afternoon for the traditional "carburetion tests."

Source: The Indianapolis News, The Sandusky Register

Starting grid

Alternates
First alternate: George Howie
Second alternate: James Patterson

Failed to qualify

Gene Haustein – Incomplete run
Milton Jones – Practice crash (fatal)
Paul Rice – Broken axle in practice
Roy Painter – Withdrew
Bennie Benefiel – Practice crash
Mauri Rose – Practice crash
Dusty Fahrnow
Fred Winnai
A. C. Aiken
Arvol Brunmeier
Buddy Calloway
Danny Day
Fred Clemons
L. L. Corum
Leon DeHart
Leon Duray
Sam Grecco
William Gardner
Harry Hunt
George Kalen
Edward Leipert
Barney McKenna
Fred Merzney
Jack Mertz
Milt Marion
Al Theisen
Marion Trexler
George Wingerter
Larry Wall
Sam Ross

Race Summary

Start
The race began at 10:00 a.m. with Edsel Ford driving the Lincoln Model KB pace car and Theodore E. "Pop" Meyers riding along, marshaling the start. Honorary starter Gar Wood joined Seth Kline to wave the green flag. At the start, Lou Moore took the lead into turn one from the pole position. Billy Arnold was second, Billy Winn third, and Ernie Triplett fourth. Arnold took the lead on the second lap, and began setting the pace. Arnold's average speed after 10 laps was 110.250 mph, breaking the previous record set in 1928.

On lap 3, Al Gordon crashed over the outside wall in turn 4. Stubby Stubblefield sideswiped Gordon, but was able to continue Gordon and his riding mechanic were uninjured. Also crashing out on lap 7 was Gus Schrader.

First half
Attrition started to mount early with several cars dropping out in the first 100 miles. Several other cars were into the pits with early tire wear, and Joe Huff needed a three-minute pit stop to repair a leaking radiator cap.

At the 50-mile mark, Billy Arnold led Lou Moore by 49 seconds. By the 100-mark, the lead had stretched to a minute and 18 seconds, and Bob Carey had moved up to second. By lap 50, Arnold had lapped the entire field except for Carey, and was running a record pace.

On lap 59, Billy Arnold's day came to end in a bad crash in turn 3. Arnold and riding mechanic Spider Matlock crashed over the wall while leading. Arnold suffered a broken shoulder and Matlock a broken pelvis – injuries similar (but opposite) to those suffered by them in a crash a year earlier. Arnold would retire from racing after the crash. The incident put Bob Carey in the lead from lap 59–94. After the race, Arnold found out that his grandmother had died the day before the race.

Carey led Lou Moore as the race passed the 200-mile distance. The race was still running at a record-shattering pace. Moore dropped out with bad timing gears, and Ernie Triplett moved up to second. On lap 94, Carey hit the outside wall in turn 4 while leading, spun around three times, and drove the car back to the pits with a damaged left front wheel. He lost ten minutes in the pits, and that handed the lead to Ernie Triplett.

Also in the pits was 8th place Fred Frame, who had water boiling from the radiator. Frame was about four laps down, and was in the pits for about one minute.

Second half

At the halfway point, Ernie Triplett led Howdy Wilcox II, Louis Schneider and Cliff Bergere. Triplett's time in front was short-lived. Ira Hall took the lead on lap 110, and Triplett dropped out after 125 laps with a failed clutch. Schneider dropped out at the same time with a broken frame.

With contenders dropping out in quick succession, Fred Frame came to the lead on lap 126. Frame led Wilbur Shaw, the only other car on the lead lap. Howdy Wilcox II and Cliff Bergere were running 3rd-4th one lap down.

As the race reached the 400-mile mark, Frame continued to lead. Wilbur Shaw lost over nine minutes after stalling his car in the pits then eventually dropped out with a broken axle. Frame was now all alone out front, and controlled the race to the finish. In the final 20 laps, Frame held an over 40-second lead over Howdy Wilcox II, with Cliff Bergere in third.

Finish
Late in the race, three incidents brought attention. On lap 182, Ira Hall blew a tire, spun and brushed the wall in the south end of the track. He was able to continue, but left his riding mechanic behind when he limped back to the pits. He re-joined the race, and was issued a one-lap penalty for driving off without the riding mechanic. He completed the 500 miles in 7th place. Luther Johnson lost a wheel on the mainstretch, and Tony Gulotta blew a tire in turn one. Gulotta's tire flung off the wheel, and nearly went over the fence into the stands. On the 178th lap, Peter Kreis skidded and crashed on the mainstretch.

Fred Frame led 58 of the final 75 laps and won the race by 44 seconds over Howdy Wilcox II. Frame charged from 27th starting position, aided by high attrition and a steady pace. It was the furthest back at that time that any driver had won the race except for Ray Harroun in 1911. Louis Meyer would equal Ray Harroun's furthest back to win (28th) in 1936. Frame's drive was not without incident, as he required six pit stops, each time taking on water to battle an overheating engine.

Source: The Indianapolis News

Box score

Statistics

For 1932, riding mechanics were required.

Notes

See also
1932 AAA Championship Car season

Works cited
Indianapolis 500 Historical Stats: 1932
ChampCarStats.com - 1932 International 500 Mile Sweepstakes

References

Indianapolis 500 races
Indianapolis 500
1932 in American motorsport